"Zukunft Pink" is a song by German musician Peter Fox featuring singer Inéz Schaefer. It was released on 20 October 2022, through Warner.

"Zukunft Pink" debuted at number one in Germany, becoming Fox's and Inéz's first song to top the chart.

Background and composition
In August 2009, Fox embarked on a farewell tour and announced that he is not going to release another solo album. Instead, he continued to be part of the band Seeed. The musician would not appear solo on a song until 2019. "Zukunft Pink" serves as the first solo release of the musician in 14 years, as well as his first musical output overall in two years.

The song was described as an "euphoric anthem" against several crises going on in the world. The Dancehall-track was widely seen as a positive future prospect, especially regarding the COVID-19 pandemic and the Russian invasion of Ukraine.

Controversy
A few days after release, the song was criticized for cultural appropriation. German-Nigerian journalist Malcolm Ohanwe accused Fox of copying and cashing in on the South-African genre Amapiano, while artists of South-African origin are barely given appreciation. Fox issued a statement on his social media, saying that he was well aware of African sound elements in the song, as made evident by an official press release prior to the song release.

Music video
The music video for "Zukunft Pink", directed by Jakob Grunert, was released on 20 October 2022. Fox once more picks up on his perception of his home town Berlin, along with its "soulless" backyards and high-rises. In contrast, the video features shots of euphoric people dancing on top of a floating skyscraper.

Charts

Weekly charts

Year-end charts

Certifications

References

2022 singles
2022 songs
German-language songs
Number-one singles in Germany